The 2021 European Speed Skating Championships took place in Heerenveen, Netherlands from 16 to 17 January 2021. It was the third time that the allround and sprint tournaments had taken place at the same time and venue.

Schedule
All times are local (UTC+1).

Medal table

Allround

Men's championships

Day 1

500 metres

5000 metres

Day 2

1500 metres

10,000 metres

Final ranking

Women's championships

Day 1

500 metres

3000 metres

Day 2

1500 metres

5000 metres

Final ranking

Sprint

Men's championships

Day 1

500 metres

1000 metres

Day 2

500 metres

1000 metres

Final ranking

Women's championships

Day 1

500 metres

1000 metres

Day 2

500 metres

1000 metres

Final ranking

References

External links
Official website
Results

2021
2021 in Dutch sport
2021 in speed skating
Sports competitions in Heerenveen
International speed skating competitions hosted by the Netherlands
January 2021 sports events in Europe